Vanlalruatfela Thlacheu (born 1 November 2003 ) is an Indian professional footballer who plays as a forward  for Indian Arrows in the I-League.

Career

Vanlalruatfela Thlacheu made his first professional appearance for Indian Arrows on 10 January 2021 against Churchill Brothers and scored a goal.

Career statistics

References

2003 births
Living people
Footballers from Mizoram
Indian footballers
India youth international footballers
Association football forwards
Indian Arrows players
I-League players